Sinpunctiptilia is a genus of moths in the family Pterophoridae.

Species
Sinpunctiptilia emissalis Walker, 1864
Sinpunctiptilia tasmaniae Arenberger, 2006

Platyptiliini
Moth genera